Johnsonism can refer to the ideology and policies of several different figures:
 Boris Johnson
 Political positions of Boris Johnson
 Lyndon B. Johnson
 Samuel Johnson
 Political views of Samuel Johnson
 Religious views of Samuel Johnson

Eponymous political ideologies